Bob Brevak (born March 28, 1947) is an American professional stock car racing driver. He was the champion of the ARCA RE/MAX Series in 1990.

Racing career
Brevak began racing in the United States Auto Club (USAC)'s stock car series between 1972 and 1983. He earned his first USAC Stock Car pole position at the Ozark Empire Fairgrounds in 1979. He earned his second pole at Winchester Speedway in 1981. While competing in USAC, he began racing in Automobile Racing Club of America (ARCA) events in 1982 including some events run under dual sanction plus a few American Speed Association (ASA) events. He continued to compete in ARCA until 1995.

Brevak made 37 NASCAR Craftsman Truck Series starts between the series' first season in 1995 and 1997. He had three Busch Series starts (1 each in 1984, 1993, and 1994). His best career finish was an 11th-place finish at Homestead in 1996.

After he retired from racing, he co-owned the No. 31 Craftsman Truck Series ride with his wife.

Motorsports career results

NASCAR
(key) (Bold – Pole position awarded by qualifying time. Italics – Pole position earned by points standings or practice time. * – Most laps led.)

Winston Cup Series

Daytona 500

Busch Series

Craftsman Truck Series

ARCA Hooters SuperCar Series
(key) (Bold – Pole position awarded by qualifying time. Italics – Pole position earned by points standings or practice time. * – Most laps led.)

References

External links
 
 
 

Living people
1947 births
People from Ashland, Wisconsin
Racing drivers from Wisconsin
NASCAR drivers
ARCA Menards Series drivers
American Speed Association drivers
NASCAR team owners